Japanese football in 2015.

J1 League

Sanfrecce Hiroshima won the Clausura title, accumulating the most points in the overall table and thus getting a bye to the Championship final, where they met third-place Gamba Osaka, who had defeated Apertura champions Urawa Red Diamonds in the semifinal. Hiroshima won the two-legged final for their eighth overall Japanese title, regaining the record position they had set in 1970 and which they had held until the old Japan Soccer League folded.

Shimizu S-Pulse was relegated to the second tier for the first time, after being one of the co-founders of the J. League back in 1993 (a placement that was deemed questionable in many quarters due to their lack of JSL record). Following after cameo appearances were Montedio Yamagata, in their fourth season, and Matsumoto Yamaga, who was debuting in the top flight only four years after being promoted from what was the third tier at the time, the Japan Football League.

J2 League

Omiya Ardija won the title and returned to the top flight at the first attempt. Júbilo Iwata followed after two years of second-tier football. In the playoffs, Avispa Fukuoka survived the final against fourth-placed Cerezo Osaka with a draw and was promoted, putting an end to four years of second-tier wilderness.

At the bottom, Tochigi SC were relegated after 6 years in the second division, while Oita Trinita had the most shocking downfall, being a former J. League Cup winner and having played first-tier football only two seasons before, and losing a test-match series to Machida Zelvia.

J3 League

Only one season after being promoted from the fourth-tier JFL, Renofa Yamaguchi won the third tier at the first attempt. Machida Zelvia settled for second place but won the test match series easily against a crestfallen Oita Trinita.

There was no relegation from this division, but the Japan Football Association folded the U-22 team.

Japan Football League

Vanraure Hachinohe won the Apertura title and an entry to the 2015 Emperor's Cup but fell in the Clausura stage to eventual winner Sony Sendai as well as to Kagoshima United, who won fourth-place overall, good enough for promotion to the J3 League.

There was no relegation, but SP Kyoto FC withdrew after the season. They will be replaced by Regional Promotion Series finalists ReinMeer Aomori and Briobecca Urayasu.

National team (Men)

Results

Players statistics

National team (Women)

Results

Players statistics

References

External links

 
Seasons in Japanese football